The Mini Aceman is an upcoming battery electric subcompact crossover SUV to be produced by German automobile manufacturer BMW and sold under the Mini marque in 2024. When launched, it will be brand's first electric SUV and second electric model after the Mini Electric hatchback.

Overview

Concept

The Mini Aceman was revealed as concept car on July 26, 2022, previewing a new design language for the Mini brand. With production beginning in 2024, the Aceman will reportedly replace the current 5-door Mini Hatch, as well as possibly the Clubman which is rumored for planned discontinuation at the end of the current generation's cycle. The Aceman will be position under the larger compact-class Mini Countryman SUV.

In August 2022 at the Gamescom video games convention in Cologne, Germany, Mini showcased a Pokémon-themed Aceman concept encased in 1:1 scale toy car packaging. Attendees could purchase a small scale model of this vehicle in identical packaging.

Production version
The production version of the Mini Aceman has been seen testing on the streets throughout 2022.

References

Concept cars
Mini (BMW) vehicles
Upcoming car models